The Spirit of Christmas may refer to:

Film and television
 The Spirit of Christmas (short films), two versions of an animated short film created by South Park creators Trey Parker and Matt Stone in 1992 and 1995
 The Spirit of Christmas (TV program), television special from the 1950s, featuring the Mabel and Les Beaton marionettes
 "The Spirit of Christmas" (Casualty), a webisode of the BBC medical drama Casualty
 The Spirit of Christmas (2015 film), an American romantic drama mystery film

Music
 The Spirit of Christmas (compilation album), a series of Christmas albums in Australia
 The Spirit of Christmas (Chuck Brown album), a 1999 album
 The Spirit of Christmas (Michael W. Smith album), a 2014 album
 The Spirit of Christmas (Ray Charles album), a 1985 album by Ray Charles